A number of ships were named Port Victor, including -

Ship names